Saint Louis Crossing is an unincorporated community in Flat Rock Township, Bartholomew County, in the U.S. state of Indiana.

History
Saint Louis Crossing was at a crossing on the Columbus & Shelbyville Railroad outside of Old Saint Louis, hence the name. A post office was established at Saint Louis Crossing in 1862, and remained in operation until it was discontinued in 1974.

Geography

References

Unincorporated communities in Bartholomew County, Indiana
Unincorporated communities in Indiana